The 2005 CHA Men's Ice Hockey Tournament was played between March 11 and March 13, 2005, at the IRA Civic Center in Grand Rapids, Minnesota. By winning the tournament, Bemidji State received College Hockey America's automatic bid to the 2005 NCAA Division I Men's Ice Hockey Tournament.

Format
The tournament featured six teams. The top two teams from the regular season received byes to the semifinals where they played the winners from the quarterfinal games. The two semifinal winners met in the championship game on March 13, 2005, with the winner receiving an automatic bid to the 2005 NCAA Division I Men's Ice Hockey Tournament.

Conference standings
Note: GP = Games played; W = Wins; L = Losses; T = Ties; PTS = Points; GF = Goals For; GA = Goals Against

Bracket

Note: * denotes overtime period(s)

Tournament awards

All-Star team
Goaltender: Scott Munroe (Alabama-Huntsville)
Defensemen: Brian Gineo (Air Force), Peter Jonsson (Bemidji State)
Forwards: Brendan Cook (Bemidji State), Brett McConnachie (Alabama-Huntsville), Ryan Miller (Bemidji State)

MVP
Matt Climie (Bemidji State)

References

External links
College Hockey America tournament history

CHA Men's Ice Hockey Tournament
Cha Men's Ice Hockey Tournament
College sports in Minnesota